Elizabeth Webber Harris (1834–1917) was an English nurse who was awarded a replica Victoria Cross (VC) in 1869, with the permission of Queen Victoria, for her bravery during a cholera outbreak in India. She remains the only woman to be awarded a VC of any description.

Early life 
Harris was born Elizabeth Matthews in Kent, England in 1834. She was the second child of James Matthews and Mary Ann Bailey. On 22 February 1859 she married Webber Desborough Harris (born 1823) then a captain in the 2nd Bengal Fusiliers (later renamed the 104th).

India and the Victoria Cross 
The details of Harris' time in India is highly reliant on her own account. In 1869 Harris was the only women with her husband's regiment, near Peshawar (modern Pakistan), during a cholera outbreak. The regiment was split in two in order to control the infection. Three months later about one-third of the soldiers in Harris's half of the regiment had died of cholera. Harris describes nursing the sick, a confrontation with local tribesmen, and the organization of extensive morale-boosting activities. 

At the time, a Victoria Cross could be awarded for bravery behind the lines. However, women were not eligible. The officers of the regiment awarded her a gold replica VC with the permission of the Queen; its inscription read:
Presented to Mrs Webber Harris by the officers of the 104th Bengal Fusiliers, for her indomitable pluck, during the cholera epidemic of 1869.

The award was presented by General Sir Sam Browne, then the commander of the Peshawar garrison. No formal citation was given with the award, as is customary for a VC.

Later life  
Harris died in 1917 in London and her ashes were interred at St Mark, Ampfield, Hampshire.

In 1920 a Royal Warrant allowed for women serving in the Armed Forces to be formally awarded the VC. However, as of December 2021, no woman has been awarded an official VC other than Harris.

See also
Female recipients of the Military Cross

Footnotes

References

External links 
An account by Mrs Webber Harris and various press clippings

1834 births
1917 deaths
19th-century English people
English nurses
British women nurses
Female wartime nurses
People from Kent
Recipients of the Victoria Cross
Women in the British military
Women of the Victorian era
British people in colonial India